Kirnach is a river of Baden-Württemberg, Germany. It is a right tributary of the Brigach near Villingen-Schwenningen. It passes through Unterkirnach.

See also
List of rivers of Baden-Württemberg

References

Rivers of Baden-Württemberg
Rivers of the Black Forest
Sankt Georgen im Schwarzwald
Rivers of Germany